Mapinguari is a genus of orchids native to Central America and northern South America.

Mapinguari auyantepuiensis (Foldats) Carnevali & R.B.Singer - Guyana, Suriname, Venezuela, Peru, Brazil 
Mapinguari desvauxianus (Rchb.f.) Carnevali & R.B.Singer - The Guianas, Venezuela, Colombia, Ecuador, Peru, Brazil 
Mapinguari foldatsianus (Carnevali & I.Ramírez) Carnevali & R.B.Singer - Guyana, Venezuela
Mapinguari longipetiolatus (Ames & C.Schweinf.) Carnevali & R.B.Singer - Costa Rica, Panama, Venezuela, Colombia, Ecuador, Peru

References

Maxillarieae genera
Maxillariinae